Guiceland is an unincorporated community 4 miles from Grapeland in Houston County, Texas. The population began to decline after World War II, and by the 1990s it was dispersed. Nearby children attend Grapeland ISD.

References

Unincorporated communities in Houston County, Texas
Unincorporated communities in Texas